Waw ( "hook") is the sixth letter of the Semitic abjads,  including 
Phoenician wāw , 
Aramaic waw ,
Hebrew  waw , 
Syriac waw ܘ 
and Arabic wāw  (sixth in abjadi order; 27th in modern Arabic order).

In text with niqqud, a dot is added to the left or on top of the letter to indicate, respectively, the two vowel pronunciations.

It is the origin of Greek Ϝ (digamma) and Υ (upsilon), Cyrillic У, Latin F and V and later Y, and the derived Latin- or Roman-alphabet letters U, and W.

Origin
The letter likely originated with an Egyptian hieroglyph which represented the word mace (transliterated as ḥḏ, hedj): T3
In Modern Hebrew, the word  vav is used to mean both "hook" and the letter's name (the name is also written ), while in Syriac and Arabic, waw to mean hook has fallen out of usage.

Arabic wāw

The Arabic letter  is named  wāw and is written in several ways depending on its position in the word:

Wāw is used to represent four distinct phonetic features:
A consonant, pronounced as a voiced labial-velar approximant , which is the case whenever it is at the beginning of a word, and sometimes elsewhere.
A long  . The preceding consonant could either have no diacritic or a short-wāw-vowel mark, damma, to aid in the pronunciation by hinting to the following long vowel.
A long  in many dialects, as a result of the monophthongization that the diphthong  underwent in most of words. 
A part of a diphthong, . In this case it has no diacritic, but could be marked with a sukun in some traditions. The preceding consonant could either have no diacritic or have  sign, hinting to the first vowel  in the diphthong.

As a vowel, wāw can serve as the carrier of a hamza: .

Wāw is the sole letter of the common Arabic word wa, the primary conjunction in Arabic, equivalent to "and". In writing, it is prefixed to the following word, sometimes including other conjunctions, such as  wa-lākin, meaning "but". Another function is the "oath", by preceding a noun of great significance to the speaker. It is often literally translatable to "By..." or "I swear to...", and is often used in the Qur'an in this way, and also in the generally fixed construction  wallāh ("By Allah!" or "I swear to God!"). The word also appears, particularly in classical verse, in the construction known as wāw rubba, to introduce a description.

Derived letters 

With an additional triple dot diacritic above waw, the letter then named ve is used to represent distinctively the consonant  in Arabic-based Uyghur and Kyrgyz.

 in Kurdish and Beja;  in Arabic-based Kazakh;  in Uyghur.
Thirty-fourth letter of the Azerbaijani Arabic script, represents ü .

A variant of Kurdish û  ; historically for Serbo-Croatian .

 in Uyghur.

 in Southern Kurdish.

Other letters
See Arabic script in Unicode

Hebrew Waw / Vav

The letter appears with or without a hook on different sans-serif fonts, for example
 Arial, DejaVu Sans, Arimo, Open Sans: ו
 Tahoma, Alef, Heebo: ו

Pronunciation in Modern Hebrew
Vav has three orthographic variants, each with a different phonemic value and phonetic realisation:

In modern Hebrew, the frequency of the usage of vav, out of all the letters, is about 10.00%.

Vav as consonant
Consonantal vav generally represents a voiced labiodental fricative (like the English v) in Ashkenazi, European Sephardi, Persian, Caucasian, Italian and modern Israeli Hebrew, and was originally a labial-velar approximant .

In modern Israeli Hebrew, some loanwords, the pronunciation of whose source contains , and their derivations, are pronounced with :  –  (but:  – ).

The pronunciation is determined by prior knowledge or must be derived through context.

Vav with a dot on top

It is pronounced  (phonemically transcribed more simply as ).

The distinction is normally ignored, and the HEBREW POINT HOLAM (U+05B9) is used in all cases.

The vowel can be denoted without the vav, as just the dot placed above and to the left of the letter it points, and it is then called . Some inadequate typefaces do not support the distinction between the  ⟨⟩ , the consonantal vav pointed with a  ⟨⟩  (compare  ⟨⟩  and consonantal vav- ⟨⟩ ). To display a consonantal vav with  correctly, the typeface must either support the vav with the Unicode combining character "HEBREW POINT HOLAM HASER FOR VAV" (U+05BA, HTML Entity (decimal) &#1466;) or the precomposed character  (U+FB4B). 

Compare the three:
 The vav with the combining character HEBREW POINT HOLAM: 
 The vav with the combining character HEBREW POINT HOLAM HASER FOR VAV: 
 The precomposed character:

Vav with a dot in the middle

Shuruk and vav with a dagesh look identical ("") and are only distinguishable through the fact that in text with niqqud, vav with a dagesh will normally be attributed a vocal point in addition, e.g. In the word , "marketing", the first ("") denotes a vav with dagesh, the second a shuruk, being the vowel attributed to the first.

Numerical value
Vav in gematria represents the number six, and when used at the beginning of Hebrew years, it means 6000 (i.e.  in numbers would be the date 6754.)

Words written as vav

Vav at the beginning of the word has several possible meanings:
 vav conjunctive (Vav Hachibur, literally "the Vav of Connection" — chibur means "joining", or "bringing together") connects two words or parts of a sentence; it is a grammatical conjunction meaning  'and' . This is the most common usage.
 vav consecutive (Vav Hahipuch, literally "the Vav of Reversal" — hipuch means "inversion"), mainly biblical, is commonly mistaken for the previous type of vav; it indicates consequence of actions and reverses the tense of the verb following it:
when placed in front of a verb in the imperfect tense, it changes the verb to the perfect tense. For example, yomar means 'he will say' and vayomar means 'he said';
when placed in front of a verb in the perfect, it changes the verb to the imperfect tense. For example, ahavtah means 'you loved', and ve'ahavtah means 'you will love'.
(Note: Older Hebrew did not have "tense" in a temporal sense, "perfect," and "imperfect" instead denoting aspect of completed or continuing action. Modern Hebrew verbal tenses have developed closer to their Indo-European counterparts, mostly having a temporal quality rather than denoting aspect. As a rule, Modern Hebrew does not use the "Vav Consecutive" form.)
 vav explicative

Yiddish

In Yiddish, the letter (known as vov) is used for several orthographic purposes in native words:
 Alone, a single vov  represents the vowel  in standard Yiddish.
 The digraph , "tsvey vovn" ('two vovs'), represents the consonant .
 The digraph , consisting of a vov followed by a yud, represents the diphthong [].
The single vov may be written with a dot on the left when necessary to avoid ambiguity and distinguish it from other functions of the letter. For example, the word vu 'where' is spelled , as tsvey vovn followed by a single vov; the single vov indicating  is marked with a dot in order to distinguish which of the three vovs represents the vowel. Some texts instead separate the digraph from the single vov with a silent aleph.

Loanwords from Hebrew or Aramaic in Yiddish are spelled as they are in their language of origin.

Syriac Waw

In the Syriac alphabet, the sixth letter is ܘ. Waw (ܘܐܘ) is pronounced [w]. When it is used as a mater lectionis, a waw with a dot above the letter is pronounced [o], and a waw with a dot under the letter is pronounced [u]. Waw has an alphabetic-numeral value of 6.

Character encodings

References

External links

Phoenician alphabet
Arabic letters
Hebrew letters
Vowel letters